This is a list of characters that were introduced in CBBC's The Story of Tracy Beaker. The series is based on the book of the same name by Jacqueline Wilson. It ran on for five series from 2002 to 2005. The series was followed by Tracy Beaker Returns that ran for three series from 2010 to 2012 and then The Dumping Ground that has aired since 2013. Connor Byrne has played the role of Mike Milligan for all three programmes although he left at the end of The Dumping Grounds seventh series. Dani Harmer, Lisa Coleman and Montanna Thompson reprised their roles as Tracy Beaker, Cam Lawson and Justine Littlewood for Tracy Beaker Returns, and again in My Mum Tracy Beaker.

Cast

Main characters
Tracy Beaker

Mike MilliganMichael Kevin Lucius "Mike" Milligan MBE, made his first appearance on 8 January 2002 in series 1 of The Story of Tracy Beaker during the episode "Tracy Returns to The Dumping Ground" and departed in "The End!" but he returned in series 5 during the episode "Caring and Sharing" as a temporary care worker. He became head care worker in "Operation Careworker". Mike appeared in all 3 series of Tracy Beaker Returns and the first 7 series of The Dumping Ground. Mike is the longest-serving and the only character in the Tracy Beaker Franchise being in the very first episode back in 2002 as well as appearing in the books although he left in Series 7 Episode 24 in 2019.

Mike is tall and slim, with grey hair and blue eyes. He is portrayed as a lovable, kind but firm guardian to the children in his care, able to deliver anger and humour to the children in equal doses. He has shared many emotional moments with the children. He is seen as a father figure to many of them, in particular to Tracy, Justine, Peter, Carmen, Tee, Gus, and Harry, something they have mentioned.

Mike makes his first appearance in the first episode of The Story of Tracy Beaker; he is a care worker at Stowey House, and has been for some time – he is already on good terms with Tracy Beaker (Dani Harmer), thinking she's a 'good kid on the whole'. He leaves at the end of series 1 after an emergency call in another care home. Mike returns in series 5 as Elm Tree House's new chef. When head care worker, Shelley Appelton (Nicola Reynolds), decides to leave Elm Tree House she holds interviews for possible head care workers, who none of the young people like, so they beg Mike to take up the role, which he does.

The character of Mike returns in Tracy Beaker Returns, appearing in every episode of the show; it is implied that he never left Elm Tree House and continued to act as head care worker. Mike is first seen with Gina Conway (Kay Purcell) when he is saying that they need more staff. He is then seen collecting Liam O'Donovan (Richard Wisker) from the local police station and met up with Tracy (Dani Harmer) after she is arrested for fraud. Mike offers her a job at the Dumping Ground because it is short-staffed, with only himself and Gina working there. As a result of this, Tracy and Mike get to know each other again and become closer. In the third series of the show, Mike is offered an MBE and accepts it, and later in the series, he only just survives when a roof falls on him.
Mike continues to appear as Head Care Worker throughout "The Dumping Ground"; in the first episode he leaves to go on holiday, only for chaos to occur at Elm Tree House until he returns at the end of the second episode, although he knows nothing about it as Gina worries he may not take another holiday again. In the eighth episode of the fourth series Carmen Howle (Amy-Leigh Hickman) reports Mike to the police, as Mike's car has been broken into, with Carmen file inside the car, and it had been stolen. However, it is revealed that Ryan Reeves (Lewis Hamilton) took the file as revenge for Mike telling the kids about his history, though he was only protecting Ryan. Mike forgives Ryan and agrees not to tell everyone. They end their feud. He later marries Fiona whom he dated 30 years ago in Series 6 Episode 24.

In the Series 7 episode, "Reunion", it is revealed that he has a twin brother named Peadar, who both grew up in a bad care home. He returns to Ireland, where he was born. He meets his mother, Sheila, and patches up his strained relationship with his brother. In the finale, he decides to leave Ashdene Ridge to return to Ireland, to be with his family. This retcons the backstory of Mike, whose character had originally revealed contradictory elements of his history in Series 5 of The Story of Tracy Beaker. Formally, Mike had suggested that his father had walked out on his mother during his teens, and indicates to Jackie that he does not understand the perspective of living as a child in care. Mike does reveal the existence of his brother during this series, however, while not specifically indicating that this brother is an identical twin. 

Cam LawsonCamilla "Cam" Lawson is a struggling turned successful author, and Tracy's eventual adoptive mother.

Camilla makes her début appearance when she visits Stowey House in series 1. Also an aspiring author, Tracy tries to get her attention by unsuccessfully using Adele's makeup. When Camilla reads her stories, she is impressed makes a number of return visits. Having formed a bond with Camilla, Tracy asked her to use her investigative skills to find her birth mother. Camilla initially agrees. However, she abandons her mission having learned from Jenny that her mother has deliberately severed ties with her daughter. Initially upset with Camilla, Tracy forgives her. Having been asked by Tracy on numerous occasions to be her foster mother, Camilla eventually agrees at the end of series 1.

Unfortunately, the foster placement is short lived when Tracy accidentally sets fire to Camilla's kitchen (series 2). With the damages being so severe that Camilla can no longer look after her properly, Tracy returns to the Dumping Ground. Whilst Tracy initially blocks Camilla from her life they eventually make up and rekindle their relationship as friends. Whilst they see each other regularly, Camilla is hesitant to foster her again. When she learns that Tracy is being fostered by Ben's aunt and uncle, she is deeply upset. However, Tracy eventually decides not to be fostered and remains at the Dumping Ground.

In the third season, Camilla leaves for New York for a writing course, but returns after she hears that Tracy is hospitalised for appendicitis. Camilla writes a novel about a girl in care whose character is based upon Tracy. Camillla falls out with Tracy again after the latter reads the ending and discovers that her inspiring character does not get fostered. They eventually reconcile.

In 'The Movie of Me' (between series 3 and 4), Camilla decides to foster Tracy again. However, Tracy's birth mother turns up and initially seems willing to take Tracy back into her care. Tracy goes to find her mum after she leaves, having fallen out with careworkers. Camilla is distraught and as soon as she finds out where she is, she pursues her with Justine in tow. When they find her, Camilla realises that Tracy's mum does not care for her and eventually fosters Tracy.

In series 4, Camilla and Tracy are happily living together again. Tracy often returns to the Dumping Ground to visit her friends.

In series 5, Camilla and Tracy are on holiday in Egypt, where Camilla develops a relationship with Gary. When they return to England, Tracy angrily returns to the Dumping Ground when Gary moves in. Having shunned Camilla once again, they reconcile in and Tracy starts to bond with Gary. This is short lived Camilla reveals that she and Gary are getting married. On the day of their wedding, Tracy, having eventually been convinced that Camilla and Gary will not neglect her as a married couple, turns up at the wedding to hear them say "I do". Afterwards, Camilla and Gary tell Tracy that they are adopting her, before they leave on their honeymoon.

Sometime between the end of the original series and the start of Tracy Beaker Returns, Camilla and Gary divorce under unknown circumstances.

At the beginning of the first series ('Tracy Beaker Returns'), Tracy uses Camilla's credit card to publish her autobiography, and is arrested. When Camilla agrees that she will drop the charges on the condition that Tracy pays her back. To save money, Tracy finds employment as a trainee careworker at the Dumping Ground. In her first week, Tracy discovers that Camilla and Mike had kept a letter from her birth mother a secret for years. At this point, there is a continuity error when Tracy exclaims that she has "never seen" her birth mother, in contradiction to flashbacks in series 1 of the original series, and the feature-length movie.

Tracy and Camilla fall out, but as usual, they reconcile. In the series 1 finale, when Tracy announces that she has been offered a job in London and will be leaving, Mike asks Camilla to foster another child. Camilla disagrees, but Johnny overhears a later phone call saying that there is no point fostering again if Tracy is not going to move out, prompting him to decide to be interviewed by Tracy in another scheme to get himself and Tee fostered. When Camilla learns of this, she goes to the Dumping Ground to see Johnny and Tee to tell them that it is not definitive that she will foster again.

In the second season, Camilla fosters Lily Kettle after she falls off the roof of the Dumping Ground during a protest. In the final episode, Camilla travels to New York. Whilst she was initially supposed to go for a few weeks, she announces that she has been given an opportunity to stay for six months, and that she has accepted it.

In the third season, Camilla is still in New York and communicates with Tracy via the internet, eventually returning to England.

Camilla is also seen in 'The Tracy Beaker Survival Files' where she is interviewed by Tracy.

In My Mum Tracy Beaker, it is revealed that she is bisexual, as she meets and ends up marrying Mary Oliver, Jess' teacher.

Camilla makes guest appearances throughout "The Beaker Girls" 

Elaine BoyakElaine Boyak (known as Elaine the Pain), portrayed by Nisha Nayar, made her first appearance on 8 January 2002 in series 1 during the episode "Dares". Her last appearance was during the episode "The Wedding" in series 5. It is unknown what happened to Elaine, and she hasn't been mentioned since. Elaine wasn't everyone's favourite person, as she was nicknamed "Elaine the Pain". In 2021, she featured in the music video of the remix of "Someday" by Keisha White alongside Chelsea Padley who portrayed Louise Govern. In 2023 she made an guest appearance in the Beaker Girls.

Duke EllingtonNorman 'Duke' Ellington,  portrayed by Clive Rowe, is a care-worker and also The Dumping Ground's chef and gardener. He is nicknamed after the jazz musician with whom he shares a surname.

He first appeared in the first episode of series 1 and departed in the final episode of series 4, when he went to visit family in the Caribbean. After this episode, most of the kids started to think he wasn't coming back, which ended up being true.

Like many of the staff, he maintains a disliking aura toward Elaine the Pain, having once locked her in the pantry to hide her from an inspector.

Jenny EdwardsJenny Ruth Edwards, portrayed by Sharlene Whyte, is the Dumping Ground's head care-worker from series 1 to 2. She is strict, but cares for the young people a lot and secretly despises social worker Elaine "The Pain" Boyak. Jenny leaves at the end of the second series, for a new job. She makes a couple of cameo appearances in later series as a cartoon character. Jenny was last mentioned in Tracy Beaker Returns. She was replaced by Shelley Appleton in Series 3. 

Justine LittlewoodJustine Littlewood portrayed by Montanna Thompson, is the rival of Tracy Beaker. She was put into care after her father, Steve Littlewood, couldn't cope after the death of her mother. He visited her occasionally.
 The Story of Tracy Beaker Series 1 (2002) -  At Stowey House, she occupied Tracy Beaker's old room, this is until Tracy returns, causing an argument between the pair and starting Tracy and Justine's iconic rivalry.Tracy Beaker Returns Series 3 (2012) - Justine returned in the third series of Tracy Beaker Returns for one episode, where she arrives and asks Mike to give her away at her wedding after her father didn't approve of her fiancé, Charlie. Carmen Howle took a liking to Justine (and Charlie) and thought they'd be the perfect foster parents for her. Mike invites Justine and Charlie round for lunch, or as the kids called it an Engagement Party (much to Tracy's disgust). At lunch Justine continues to talk about herself making Tracy feel jealous, but Justine crosses the line after she tells everyone that when Tracy was a kid, she used to lie a lot about her mum being a big Hollywood star. And that she'd join her in Hollywood to be a star too. Justine then added that she almost believed her, seemingly trying to make out she wasn't being mean but it was obvious to Tracy that she was. During lunch Justine's fiancé Charlie gets a phone call, Rick Barber (who was already suspicious of Charlie) sneaks out the dining room to listen in on Charlie, and it sounds dodgy. Especially when Charlie comes back into the dining room saying his mum has had a fall, which didn't sound like what Rick overheard. Rick then follows Charlie out telling him he knows what he's doing as his parents were con artists too. Charlie threatens Rick and bribes him not to tell Justine by giving him a new laptop. After lunch Justine takes Gina Conway, Carmen, Lily Kettle, Tee Taylor and Sapphire Fox shopping, they come back with loads of clothes and jewellery from Justine and while they were out, Justine told the girls about the time when Tracy dared her to steal Jenny Edwards' clothes while she was in the shower (which later the girls decide to steal Tracy's clothes while she's in the shower, thinking she'd find it funny, which she didn't find amusing in the slightest). Later in the dining room Justine is discussing her wedding day plans to Carmen, showing her pictures of the venue and her wedding dress, and even invites Carmen along to the wedding. Carmen then asks Justine about fostering which freaks Justine out a little but says she'll think about it and talk to Charlie after Carmen said it worked for Cam and Tracy. Tracy overhears this and grows a little jealous but also thinks Justine is just saying she'll foster Carmen to get one over on Tracy. Justine then says that Tracy hasn't changed and that she still thinks the whole world revolves around Tracy Beaker and then starts mocking her book she wrote, which starts a classic Beaker and Littlewood Brawl. Carmen stops them and shouts at Tracy and saying how much she believes that Justine and Charlie are going to foster her. Rick then walks in a decides to tell the truth about Charlie. Rick tells Justine that Charlie is a con man and has loads of other girls on the go and twists things and lies to scam all these girls for their money, Justine refuses to believe her husband to be could be this evil, but agrees to team up with Tracy to find out the truth. So Justine, Tracy, Rick and Cam to team up to set a trap to catch Charlie out.  After Charlie is caught out by Justine, with the help of Rick, Cam and Tracy, Justine ends it with Charlie and goes up to make up with her dad. Justine later goes back to the Dumping Ground to tell Mike and Gina what happened and what Charlie was up to, and that she found out Charlie's mum was in on the whole scam as well. Justine then goes to speak to Carmen to apologise that she won't be able to foster Carmen anymore after what's happened. Carmen calmly accepts the decision and reminds Justine what Tracy always tells them, that Dumping Ground Kids can cope with anything. Justine then tells Carmen to never to tell anyone she said that "Tracy Beaker's right". Before Justine leaves, her and Tracy have a heart to heart and reminisce their times in the DG. Tracy then goes on to say that she is a complete failure compared to Justine, but Justine says she doesn't think Tracy is a failure because her job just makes good money, while Tracy's job changes lives, then tells Tracy she's doing OK.My Mum Tracy Beaker (2021)Justine emerges again as Tracy's arch nemeses. At first, the two are getting along well and reminiscing over past characters in the franchise. Justine takes a liking to Sean Godfrey, Tracy's fiance, and begins an affair with him. It ultimately leads to the break-off of the wedding and Tracy's depressed state in the series/movie. Justine is present in the last episode, popping up at Tracy's workplace for an unknown reason. A fight occurs and scares off Justine, who seems heartbroken and lonely.  The Beaker Girls (2021)Justine appears in the second installment, The Beaker Girls, for two episodes in which she tells Tracy to leave Sean Godfrey alone as she believes they are back together. This leads to an argument between Sean and Justine, revealing that they continued seeing each other but had a toxic on-and-off relationship. 

Tracy took her into the Dumping Ground Shop and tried to calm her down, but Justine clearly had something on her mind. She revealed that her father, Steve Littlewood, had been diagnosed with dementia, and she had been visiting him at a care home. Throughout the episode, Justine tries to inform Sean and Tracy about something else important but is interrupted every time. Finally, when she attempted for the second time, Sean entered the building, and it caused her to hesitate and not reveal her secret. She then leaves abruptly. 

In Episode 5, Justine appears again after a few months and announces the passing of her father due to dementia. It is also disclosed from her appearance that she was pregnant along and in her last trimester. Justine is disturbed by Sean's surprise presence, concludes that he is the father, and leaves while it is flooding. She isn't seen in the episode until Jess and Jordan find her on the beach in labor. They were stuck in the storm and had no way to call emergency services in time, so she was relocated to the beach hut to give birth. She gave birth to her son, Steve Godfrey Littlewood, named after her father. The episode ended with the main Beaker girls cast, Tracy, Cam, Justine (and her newborn son), Peter Ingham, Sean, Jess, Jordan, Si Martin, Mary, Flo, and Tyrone, all celebrating Christmas in the Dumping Ground shop.

Louise GovernLouise Govern, portrayed by Chelsie Padley, made her first appearance in the first episode of series 1. Louise was best friends with Tracy before she was fostered by a couple called Ted and Julie. However, Tracy never contacted Louise whilst she was away, so when Justine Littlewood arrived at the Dumping Ground, she became her new best friend. However, when Tracy returned, she became jealous of Louise and Justine, resulting in arguments and Tracy breaking Justine's clock. Louise leaves after she is fostered by the Morris family, in "The Long Goodbye". However she makes guest appearances in series 3,She also appeared in the "Parties with Pudsey" special in 2004. In 2021, Chelsie reprised her role as Louise in the music video, "Someday". She delivers a pizza to Tracy's house. Neither of them knew who each other were.

Adele AzupadiAdele Azupadi, portrayed by Rochelle Gadd, made her first appearance in the first episode of series 1. Adele is the eldest resident of the Dumping Ground in the first series and works part-time in a clothing store. Adele is kind though usually keeps herself to herself however she intervenes if she has to.

In the episode "Temporary Care Worker", she reveals that when she went into care for the first time (when she was Maxy's age), she was looked after by Leah, one of the former residents who became the titular temporary care worker in the episode.

Adele returns in series 2, and is seen to be living in a bed-sit on her own. This is until, Tracy visits her and she admits that she is lonely living on her own. Adele then returns to live in the Dumping Ground. She is not seen in series 3, as it is thought that she had now moved out, and back into her bed-sit.

Ben Batambuze
 Ben Batambuze, portrayed by Luke Youngblood, made his first appearance in the first series of The Story of Tracy Beaker.

He is Tracy's best friend. He seems to be living on the streets. However, in the episode, 'The Truth Comes Out', Tracy finds out that Ben has a mum and dad and is left shocked.

Then, in the episode, 'Birthday' he tries to make it up to Tracy by saving her birthday party. He departs in the final episode of series 2.

He did not appear in series 3 but was mentioned by Tracy that he went to boarding school in the first episode of that series 'Leavin' on a Jet Plane'.

Peter InghamPeter Ingham, portrayed by Joe Starrs, appears in series 1 of The Story of Tracy Beaker.

He likes to think he is Tracy's 'best friend', however Tracy often disagrees and brands him a 'weed'.

In one episode, Jill and Terry Brown, take Tracy out but they decide that they do not want to foster her, but they want to foster Peter instead. They eventually foster him in series 1 in the episode "Cut the Weed, however he returns to the Dumping Ground out of being afraid and missing the Dumping Ground. Tracy convinces him to stay with Jill and Terry Brown.

He made his last appearance in the series 1 finale. It is revealed that he became a headmaster at a school near the coastal town of Cooksea. He made a guest appearance in the third episode of series 1 of My Mum Tracy Beaker, almost 19 years later. He returned in The Beaker Girls, where he is the Headteacher at Jess' new school. He and Tracy kiss in the episode "Telling Stories".

Ryan Patterson
 Ryan Patterson, portrayed by Sonny Muslim, makes his first appearance in the first series of The Story of Tracy Beaker.

Ryan moved to The Dumping Ground with his non-identical twin brother, Zac. He speaks in a Cockney dialect and is interested in judo. He gets up to mischief with his twin Zac, and Maxy. Ryan doesn't usually take no for an answer.

Ryan leaves The Dumping Ground with his brother Zac, between series 1 and 2. It's unknown what happened to Zac and Ryan, though it's likely they were fostered, or went back to their parents.

Zac PattersonZac Patterson, portrayed by Jay Haher, makes his first appearance in the first series of The Story of Tracy Beaker.

Zac moved to The Dumping Ground with his non-identical twin brother, Ryan. He gets up to mischief with his twin Ryan, and Maxy.

Zac leaves The Dumping Ground with his brother Ryan, between series 1 and 2. It's unknown what happened to Zac and Ryan, though it's likely they were fostered, or went back to their parents.

Maxy King
 Maxy King, portrayed by Jerome Holder, made his first appearance in the first episode of series 1.

He is described as a sweet-loving 7-year-old who used to live in The Dumping Ground.

Maxy leaves in-between Series 1 and 2. He was reportedly fostered by an African family. A snap shot photo of him is seen from the Series 1 episode 'Tracy's Birthday' when Dolly is showing Nathan, Duke's and Jenny's Halloween costumes, in the episode 'Back And Bad', the first episode of series 2. He mentioned at the end of Series 1 he was going to be fostered soon to Jenny, so it's likely he was fostered in between series 1 and 2.

Bouncer Plakova
 Bradley "Bouncer" Plakova, portrayed by Ben Hanson, made his first appearance on 7 January 2003 in series 2 of The Story of Tracy Beaker during the episode Back and Bad. He departed on 9 December 2005 in series 5 during the episode The Wedding. 

Bouncer and his brother Lol are described as kind, funny characters who don't take things too seriously.

Bouncer departs in series 4 when he moves to a Halfway House, which caused tension between him and his brother Lol, resulting in an argument in the episode 'Bouncer VS Lol'.

He later returns in series 5 as a chef at The Dumping Ground. He makes his final appearance in 'The Wedding'. 

Lol PlakovaLawrence "Lol" Plakova, portrayed by Ciaran Joyce, made his first appearance on 7 January 2003 in series 2 of The Story of Tracy Beaker during the episode Back and Bad. He departed on 9 December 2005 in series 5 during the episode The Wedding.

DollyDolly, portrayed by Chloe Hibbert-Waters, made her first appearance on 7 January 2003 in series 2 of The Story of Tracy Beaker during the episode Back and Bad. She departed on 4 December 2003 in series 3 during the episode The Beaker Club when she gets fostered. When Nathan Jones arrives at The Dumping Ground in the first episode of series 2, to be a trainee care worker, Dolly starts to like him already. She said Lol that she thinks he's beautiful. After Tracy returns to the Dumping Ground, Dolly begs Tracy to help prank Nathan after he didn't give Dolly her special chocolate biscuit. Tracy and Dolly pretend that there is a 'Saturday Silly Hour' so they could make Nathan could embarrasses himself at dinner time in front of the kids, Duke and Jenny. Nathan keeps a close eye on Dolly, even though he lost a girlfriend thanks to her.

Nathan Jones
 Nathan Jones, portrayed by James Cartwright, made his first appearance on 7 January 2003 in series 2 of The Story of Tracy Beaker during the episode Back and Bad. He departed on 1 April 2004 in series 3 during the episode Good as Gold.

He is described as 'lazy and an idiot', by Tracy, but is also described as 'fun', and is more of an older brother, especially to Dolly. Even though Nathan isn't always the most professional care worker, he has proved that he can be serious and has shown that he has got what it takes to be a care worker. Sometimes he can say things that unintentionally upsets or hurts the residents' feelings.

Nathan leaves in-between series 3 and The Movie. It's unknown how or why. He either resigned, got another job in a different care home, or was fired. 

Amber HearstAmber Hearst, portrayed by Alicia Hooper, made her first appearance on 21 January 2003 in series 2 of The Story of Tracy Beaker during the episode Alien. She departed on 3 April 2003 in the same series during the episode Home and Hosed.

She is described as rebellious, has a bad attitude and is bad-tempered. She often antagonises everyone else at the Dumping Ground. Amber has had a difficult life and has lived in many care homes, and ran away from all of them before moving into Stowey House. Even though Amber doesn't have any close friends at the Dumping Ground she does have a few on and off friendships with Tracy Beaker and Justine Littlewood. In 'The Long Goodbye' she meets Colin and Selima and gets on with them.

She made her final appearance in the episode 'Home and Hosed'. It's unknown what happened to her as she had left off screen, and none of the other characters mentioned her since. It could be assumed that she gets fostered by Colin and Selima.

Crash WatkinsLiam "Crash" Watkins, portrayed by Darragh Mortell, made his first appearance on 9 October 2003 in series 3 of The Story of Tracy Beaker during the episode Leavin' on a Jet Plane. He departed on 9 December 2005 in series 5 during the episode The Wedding. However, he made his final ever appearance in Children's Party at the Palace for Queen Elizabeth's 80th birthday in 2006

Crash has quite a bad and short temper, due to his background and life before he lived in care. Crash's father was also very angry and short tempered after his wife (Crash's mother) left, and he took his anger out of Crash. He has quite a few close friends in the Dumping Ground. Crash was the first resident to make an effort in making friends with Jackie Hopper when she first arrived. Crash later became close friends with Tracy, Lol and Bouncer.

Michael GriceMichael Grice, portrayed by William Tomlin, made his first appearance on 25 September 2003 in series 3 of The Story of Tracy Beaker during the episode Leavin' on a Jet Plane. He departed on 9 December 2005 in series 3 during the episode Good as Gold.

Michael has few redeeming qualities, he bullies and snitches on everyone and usually only does things to please himself. Due to his hostile personality, Michael isn't seen to have many close friends; he's known to be particularly spiteful to Jackie, often mocking her about her sick grandfather and her constant attempts to run away. He's also been known to provoke Crash on a number of occasions.

He makes his final appearance at the end of the series and didn't return for the movie or series 4.

Marco MaloneyMarco Maloney, portrayed by Jack Edwards, made his first appearance on 25 September 2003 in series 3 of The Story of Tracy Beaker during the episode Leavin' on a Jet Plane. He departed on 8 December 2005 in series 5 during the episode Two's a Crowd.

He often wears costumes and dress-up, and is always wearing new and original costumes. He is often described as 'weird' and 'crazy' by other people who live at The Dumping Ground.

He is best friends with Milly and gets fostered with Milly by the Boxer family in the episode 'Two's a Crowd'

Hayley SparksHayley Sparks, portrayed by Kristal Lau, made her first appearance on 25 September 2003 in series 3 of The Story of Tracy Beaker during the episode Leavin' on a Jet Plane. She departed on 4 January 2005 in series 4 during the episode Beam Me Up, Scottie.

Hayley is described as quiet, she often gets annoyed when she is ignored.

She made her final appearance in 'Beam Me Up, Scottie', when she moved in with her foster parents, Mark and Helen.

Layla Layla , portrayed by Cara Readle,  made her first appearance on 25 September 2003 in series 3 of The Story of Tracy Beaker during the episode Leavin' on a Jet Plane. She departed on 9 December 2005 in series 5 during the episode The Wedding.

Layla is a quiet girl with cerebral palsy and is described as a kind and caring person, although gets upset very quickly, especially when Hayley left without telling her.

She made her final appearance in 'The Wedding'. It is unknown what happened to her after leaving in care.

Shelley AppletonShelley Appleton, portrayed by Nicola Reynolds, made her first appearance on 9 October 2003 in series 3 of The Story of Tracy Beaker during the episode Leavin' on a Jet Plane. She departed on 1 April 2004 in series 3 during the episode Good as Gold. Shelley returned on 2 December 2005 in series 5 during the episode Telling Tales. She departed on 6 December 2005 in series 5 during the episode Operation Careworker.

She then returned in series 5 as Temporary Head Careworker, before leaving once again in the episode 'Operation Careworker'.

She has a cool, collected and confident attitude, but ultimately has a huge affection for all the kids. In series 3, it is mentioned that she became interested in being a careworker because she cared for her dad as a child, because he had Alzheimer's disease.

Jackie HopperJackie Hopper, portrayed by Abby Rakic-Platt, made her first appearance on 9 October 2003 in series 3 of The Story of Tracy Beaker during the episode Jackie. She departed on 9 December 2005 in series 4 during the episode The Wedding.

When Jackie is brought to the Dumping Ground, she refuses to accept that she needs to be in care, and that her beloved grandad has Alzheimer's and can no longer look after her. She's determined to escape, collect Grandpa from his nursing home and return to their old house together. Eventually, she ends up staying at the Dumping Ground even though she doesn't like it. She later becomes good friends with Tracy and Crash.

She departs during the final episode of series 4, to attend a sports academy, however returns in series 5 after admitting she faked an injury to return to the Dumping Ground.

Sid RooneySid Rooney, portrayed by Vincenzo Pellegrino, made his first appearance on 7 October 2004 in series 4 of The Story of Tracy Beaker during the episode Return to Sender. He departed on 5 April 2005 in series 4 during the episode We're off the Map Now.

Sid is described as being very boring, but when he takes a few days' break and leaves the Dumping Ground in the care of a draconian careworker, they realise they are lucky to have him, and welcome him back.

He made his last appearance in the final episode of series 4.

Chantal WellardChantal Wellard, portrayed by Deepal Parmar, made her first appearance on 7 October 2004 in series 4 of The Story of Tracy Beaker during the episode  Return to Sender. She departed on 29 November 2005 in series 5 during the episode Chantal's Goodbye.

Social worker Elaine Boyak (Nisha Nayar) brings Chantal and her half-brother, Rio Wellard (Craig Roberts), and her half-sister, Roxy Wellard (Sophie Borja), to The Dumping Ground on the day the young people move from Elm Tree House to Cliffside. Bouncer Plakova (Ben Hanson) and Lol Plakova (Ciaran Joyce), who used to be in care with them, are initially determined to stand up to them, but back down as care worker Duke Ellington (Clive Rowe) recalls their behaviour on a visit to a care home they were at; head care worker Sid Rooney (Vincenzo Pellegrino) decides to give Chantal, Rio and Roxy a chance, but Chantal starts an egg fight with Marco Maloney (Jack Edwards) and demand sweets from the others. When they go to argue with Crash (Darragh Mortell), Tracy Beaker (Dani Harmer) and the other young people stand up to them. The Wellards encourage Jackie Hopper (Abby Rakic-Platt) to steal their files to destroy, but when she is caught by Sid, she and Crash post fake files about The Wellards. Crash and Jackie decide to kill the Wellards with kindness instead of fighting with them, so Jackie does not get angry with Chantal when she takes her jacket, but Chantal becomes emotional when Jackie lends her a pair of her trainers. The Wellards intercept letters from Bouncer to trainee care workerJane (Evelyn Duah) and write back, pretending to be Jane, asking for presents. When The Dumping Ground has an inspection, the Wellards devise a plan to get it shut down by pretending they are mistreated, but it backfires when Tracy informs the inspector, Mr Pincher (Keiron Self), it's a set up. Lol sets up a mock talk show when Chantal steals Crash's mum's engagement ring. The girls separate themselves from the boys, but are brought together by their hatred for Elaine. Jealous with Tracy receiving money from her foster grandmother, the young people invite two elderly people from an old peoples home in order to get money, but they fail when the elderly people figure out what they are up to.

Unlike her younger siblings, who are both white, Chantal appears to be of Indian descent.

Rio WellardRio Wellard, portrayed by Craig Roberts,  made his first appearance on 7 October 2004 in series 4 of The Story of Tracy Beaker during the episode  Return to Sender. He departed on 9 December 2005 in series 5 during the episode The Wedding.

Rio is feisty but kind. He is close to his half sisters Roxy and Chantal, and is a rebellious bully at first and immediately argues with Crash. In Series 5, Chantal then leaves the Dumping Ground. He then becomes more open with the other care kids and makes friends with Crash. Him and Roxy often dream big. He is a main part in Roxy's schemes. He is very protective over Roxy and cares for her even though they fight at times.

He makes his final appearance in 'The Wedding'.

Roxy WellardRoxy Wellard, portrayed by Sophie Borja, made her first appearance on 7 October 2004 in series 4 of The Story of Tracy Beaker during the episode  Return to Sender. She departed on 9 December 2005 in series 5 during the episode The Wedding.

Roxy is the youngest of her siblings but often takes control. Roxy is described as a stereotypical goth. She is always seen wearing black and white, a high ponytail fastened with either a bronze, pink or black feathery flower band and sometimes earrings. However, her face looks innocent but her "bad girl" look makes her intimidating. Her age is unknown but is about 8 or 9 as she looks older than she actually is.

She makes her final appearance in 'The Wedding'.

WolfieShawn "Wolfie", portrayed by Felix Drake, made his first appearance on 15 March 2005 in series 4 of The Story of Tracy Beaker during the episode 'Independence Day'. He departed on 9 December 2005 in series 5 during the episode 'The Wedding'.

He does not like sleeping in a bed, and suffers from claustrophobia, as he hates being locked in. He makes friends with Lol shortly after his arrival, which annoys Lol's brother, Bouncer.

Rebecca ChalmersRebecca Chalmers, portrayed by Georgina Hagen, made her first appearance on 28 November 2005 in series 5 of The Story of Tracy Beaker during the episode 'Caring and Sharing'. She departed on 9 December 2005 in series 5 during the episode 'The Wedding'.

Rebecca doesn't get on with many people, primarily Justine. She is quite a troublemaker, and likes to stir things up.

MillyMilly, portrayed by Holly Gibbs, made her first appearance on 30 November 2005 in series 5 of The Story of Tracy Beaker during the episode Scary Milly. She departed on 8 December 2005 in series 5 during the episode Two's a Crowd.

Upon her arrival, the other people at the Dumping Ground assume she is 'cursed' due to strange events that keep happening that day. She quickly befriends Marco. Milly never speaks, and only spoke when Elaine asked if she wanted to be fostered.

She departed in series 5 during the episode 'Two's A Crowd'.

AliceAlice, portrayed by Olive Gray, made her first appearance on 1 December 2005 in series 5 of The Story of Tracy Beaker during the episode  Return to Sender. She departed on 9 December 2005 in series 5 during the episode The Wedding.

Alice arrives at The Dumping Ground with social worker Elaine (Nisha Nayar) and Alice is happy to be sharing a room with Layla (Cara Readle). Alice tells Layla about her tooth fairy and shows her her fairy palace, which Roxy (Sophie Borja) insults. After Elaine's visit to a life coach, she unintentionally upsets Alice by throwing out her fairy palace, but helps mend it. After Roxy and her half-brother, Rio (Craig Roberts), and Rebecca (Georgina Hagen) find out Wolfie (Felix Drake) has unwanted money from his parents, they use Alice to help make friends with him and Alice is angry that they only want Wolfie for his money. After Roxy ruins Layla's bag, Alice lends her necklace, which she claims has mystical powers and a dog turns up at The Dumping Ground, which the young people want to keep. A set of foster parents decide to foster the dog, which is named Tracy after Tracy (Dani Harmer), after the young people try to impress them. When Elaine is iced, Justine (Montanna Thompson) attempts to discover who was responsible to prevent everyone being grounded by Shelley (Nicola Reynolds) and Alice soon confesses she was responsible as she did not want to go out with foster parents who do not believe in fairies. When Shelley asks for the person to own up, everyone claims they did it. When Shelley is about to leave, interviews are held for the new head careworker and Alice dislikes one of the candidates, Lucy, who everyone else likes. Roxy supports Alice by making a story up that Lucy worked at her old care home and mistreated a boy. Bouncer (Ben Hanson) returns to The Dumping Ground as chef, but the young people hate his food, apart from Alice and Rio. When a cooking competition between Bouncer and Mike (Connor Byrne) is suggested, Alice and Rio are selected to try their food, but the young people begin to like Bouncer's food and join in with Alice's meditating. When Tracy puts chilli powder in Bouncer's food and Alice eats it, she starts a food fight. At Lol's (Ciaran Joyce) leaving party, Alice does palm reading, but upsets Tracy and Justine with her predictions. Alice attends Cam (Lisa Coleman) and Gary's (George McAllister) wedding.

Recurring characters
Steve LittlewoodSteve Littlewood, portrayed by Stephen Crossley from 2002 to 2004 and Morgan Hopkins in 2005, made his first appearance on 8 January 2002 in series 1 of The Story of Tracy Beaker during the episode Tracy Returns to the Dumping Ground. He departed in series 5 during the episode Two's A Crowd.

Steve introduces his new girlfriend Carrie (Caroline Bunce) to his daughter, Justine (Montanna Thompson), however, Carrie isn't well received by Justine. When Carrie and Steve are getting married, Justine is their bridesmaid, however, Justine isn't happy with the dress and the young people decide to alter it. Tracy (Dani Harmer), Louise (Chelsie Padley) and Amber (Alicia Hooper) make a mess of the dress, but Adele (Rochelle Gadd) manages to fix it. Pizza is thrown at Justine's dress when the kids have a food fight and Justine refuses to go to the wedding, but Tracy and Lol (Ciaran Joyce) talk her round and Justine gets to their wedding in time.

When Steve cancels taking Justine out, Carrie visits Justine and she breaks the news to Justine that she is pregnant and Justine doesn't take it well. Carrie later tells Justine that the real reason for her visit is that once she and Steve are organised, they want her to live with them. Justine suspects that her dad and Carrie are going to tell her some bad news when he takes her out for dinner due to Steve buying her things, however, it turns out to be good news when Steve and Carrie tell Justine they want her to move in the following week. At Justine's party, Justine gets fed up when her dad and Carrie go on about the baby and she soon snaps. Steve and Carrie later apologise to her for doing so during her party.

When Steve's nephew, John (Adam Skilton) turns up. Justine is uncomfortable and when Justine has to give up her room, Carrie tells Justine it is her father's decision and Justine decides to move back to The Dumping Ground. Elaine (Nisha Nayer) sets up a meeting between Steve and Justine, but lies to Justine that she wants her photo taken and Justine is displeased when she discovers Elaine has lied to her. On Special Guest's day, Justine is unhappy when her father brings John along. When John has an allergic reaction to nuts, Justine gives John his injection and John apologises to Justine. In 2021, in The Beaker Girls it was revealed by Justine Steve had dementia. Subsequently in the final episode after a time jump to a few months later it was announced that Steve had died from dementia. In honour of her late father, Justine gave birth to a baby boy whom, she called Steve Godfrey Littlewood in, memoriam of her father 

CarrieCarrie''', portrayed by Caroline Bunce from 2003 to 2004 and Kathryn Dimery in 2005, made her first appearance on 23 January 2003 in series 2 of The Story of Tracy Beaker during the episode Doggie. She departed in series 5 during the episode Caring and Sharing''.

Steve (Stephen Crossley) introduces Carrie to his daughter, Justine (Montanna Thompson), however, Carrie is not well received by Justine. When Carrie and Steve are getting married, Justine is their bridesmaid, however, Justine isn't happy with the dress and the kids decide to alter it. Tracy (Dani Harmer), Louise (Chelsie Padley) and Amber (Alicia Hooper) make a mess of the dress, but Adele (Rochelle Gadd) manages to fix it. Pizza is thrown at Justine's dress when the kids have a food fight and Justine refuses to go to the wedding, but Tracy and Lol (Ciaran Joyce) talk her round and Justine gets to their wedding in time.

When Steve cancels taking Justine out, Carrie visits Justine and she breaks the news to Justine that she is pregnant and Justine doesn't take it well. Carrie later tells Justine that the real reason for her visit is that once she and Steve are organised, they want her to live with them. Justine suspects that her dad and Carrie are going to tell her some bad news when he takes her out for dinner due to Steve buying her things, however, it turns out to be good news when Carrie and Steve tell Justine they want her to move in the following week. At Justine's party, Justine gets fed up when her dad and Carrie go on about the baby and she soon snaps. Carrie and Steve later apologise to her for doing so during her party.

When Steve's nephew, John (Adam Skilton) turns up, Justine is uncomfortable and when Justine has to give up her room, Carrie tells Justine it is her father's decision and Justine decides to move back to The Dumping Ground.

Others

See also
List of The Story of Tracy Beaker (franchise) characters
List of Tracy Beaker Returns characters
List of The Dumping Ground characters

References

External links

Story of Tracy Beaker
Story of Tracy Beaker
Tracy Beaker series characters